The Forum for the Restoration of Democracy (FORD) is a political party in Tanzania. The party was registered on 18 January 2002.

The party didn't field a presidential candidate in the 14 December 2005 election, but supported Sengondo Mvungi of the National Convention for Construction and Reform-Mageuzi. He placed fifth out of ten candidates, winning 0.49% of the vote. 

2002 establishments in Tanzania
Political parties established in 2002
Political parties in Tanzania